Ádám Orovecz (born 23 October 1997) is a Hungarian football who currently plays for Balmazújvárosi FC.

Club career
On 4 November 2017, he was signed by Nemzeti Bajnokság I club Balmazújvárosi FC.

Career statistics

References

External links
Balmazújváros Official Website

1997 births
Living people
People from Hódmezővásárhely
Hungarian footballers
Association football midfielders
Balmazújvárosi FC players
Nemzeti Bajnokság I players
Sportspeople from Csongrád-Csanád County